Matheus Nunes Fagundes de Araújo (born 1 March 2001), better known as MT or Matheus Nunes, is a Brazilian professional footballer who plays as a midfielder or left-back for Santa Clara, on loan from Vasco da Gama.

Club career
MT is a youth product of Volta Redonda, and moved over to the youth academy of Vasco da Gama in 2019. He was transferred to Vasco da Gama's senior team on 18 May 2021, signing a contract until 2023. He made his professional debut with Vasco da Gama in a 1–1 Copa do Brasil tie with Caldense on 18 March 2021. On 8 August 2022, he joined the Portuguese Primeira Liga club Santa Clara on a season-long loan with an option to buy.

Career statistics

References

External links
 
 

2001 births
Living people
People from Cabo Frio
Brazilian footballers
Association football midfielders
Association football fullbacks
CR Vasco da Gama players
C.D. Santa Clara players
Primeira Liga players
Campeonato Brasileiro Série B players
Brazilian expatriate footballers
Brazilian expatriates in Portugal
Expatriate footballers in Portugal